The 2001 Sudirman Cup was the 7th tournament of the World Mixed Team Badminton Championships of Sudirman Cup. It was held from May 28 to June 2, 2001 in Seville, Spain.

Teams
53 teams around the world took part in this tournament. Cyprus, Jordan, Mauritius and Nigeria withdrew from the competition.

Group 1

Group A

Group B

Play-offs

Knockout stage

Semi-finals

Final

Group 2

Subgroup 2A

Subgroup 2B

Playoff

Group 3

Subgroup 3A

Subgroup 3B

Playoff

Group 4

Subgroup 4A

Subgroup 4B

Playoff

Group 5

Subgroup 5A

Subgroup 5B

Playoff

Group 6

Subgroup 6A

Subgroup 6B

Playoff

Group 7

Subgroup 7A

Subgroup 7B

Playoff

Final classification

Notes
 Gibraltar competed as the neutral IBF Team in this competition due to Gibraltar dispute. An appeal by Gibraltar Badminton Association to compete with its own name and flag was rejected by Court of Arbitration for Sport.

References

External links
Smash: Sudirman Cup
SudirmanCup 2001 Sevilla, Spanien

2001
2001 in badminton
2001 in Spanish sport
International sports competitions hosted by Spain
Badminton tournaments in Spain